Lake Žuvintas is a shallow lake in Alytus district, central Lithuania. Area of Žuvintas Lake is 965 ha. It is the shallowest lake in Lithuania with the greatest depth 3 m and average only 0.6 m. It is a paradise for water birds, but also faces danger of becoming a swamp.

Nature reserve

It is a strictly protected reserve. It is first Nature Reserve in Lithuania, established by an outstanding Lithuanian naturalist and ornithologist professor Tadas Ivanauskas (1882–1970) in 1937. Žuvintas Strict Nature Reserve was enrolled into the International list of Designated Wetlands and Shallow Waters of International Importance (Ramsar Convention) since 1993. Žuvintas Biosphere Reserve has the status of Important Bird Area (IBA) and Site of Community Importance (SAC) in compliance with the established criteria for European conservation territories of natural Habitats and of Wild Fauna and Flora since 2004. In 2011 it has become a UNESCO Biosphere Reserve.

References

External links
   Official site of Žuvintas Biosphere Reserve

Zuvintas
Important Bird Areas of Lithuania
Ramsar sites in Lithuania